Cueva de Los Indios, also known as the Cueva Punta Maldonado site, in the municipality of Loíza, Puerto Rico, was listed on the National Register of Historic Places in 1982.

It is a "small" cave with petroglyphs that were, as of 1981, well-preserved, with no evidence of vandalism or other disturbance.  In 1981 it was asserted that site is the "only recorded ceremonial cave in the northeastern coast of Puerto Rico that corresponds to the Taino aboriginal occupation" and that it was a site with high archeological research potential.

References

Archaeological sites on the National Register of Historic Places in Puerto Rico
Caves of Puerto Rico
Loíza, Puerto Rico
Petroglyphs in Puerto Rico